Claire Fontaine is a feminist, conceptual artist, founded in Paris in 2004 by Fulvia Carnevale and James Thornhill, an Italian-British artist duo who declared themselves her assistants. Since 2018 Claire Fontaine lives and works in Palermo and has a studio in the historical centre of the Kalsa near Piazza Magione.

After lifting her name from a popular brand of French school notebooks and stationary, Claire Fontaine declared herself a readymade artist and began to elaborate a version of neo-conceptual art that often looks like other people's work. Claire Fontaine translated into English means "Clear Fountain" and can also be conceptually linked to the artwork Fountain by Marcel Duchamp, known as the most famous readymade.

Work 
Claire Fontaine uses the concept of the readymade as a way of criticising "production" disguised as a creation of more and more artefacts that are desirable because they superficially appear as new. Generally she works with appropriation on a formal level and she hijacks contents, using sculpture, installation, video and painting to create an emotionally loaded criticism of the author and the forms of authority at this stage of capitalism. This aesthetic approach that she describes as "expropriation", a way of giving an existential use value to pre-existing objects and artworks, also addresses the general crisis of singularity, which she describes as the individual and collective impossibility to give a meaning to one's life under the current political circumstance and the systematic surveillance, repression and countless limitations of our freedom. Claire Fontaine prefers to integrate the existing art circuit to create complicities and foster change which entails partaking in the mechanisms and subjects of the art industry including collectors, dealers and institutions.

In an Interview with Circa Art Magazine in 2008 she states: "I think forming gangs, mafias, collectives, networks, bands of people is a way to survive in the hostile capitalist system and then eventually a way to become a pressure group, in order to transform these particular conditions."

Writing and text based pieces play an important role in Claire Fontaine's work. She distributes texts in her exhibitions and she uses different registers in her writing such as poetry, critical theory, essays and manifestos. The artist criticises the hierarchy between visual and verbal expression.

In February 2020 she was invited by Maria Grazia Chiuri to create the mise-en-scène for Dior's Autumn/Winter 2020 collection for Paris Fashion Week which took place in the Les Tuileries. The artist used the catwalk to perform an operation of Institutional Critique investing the floor and the ceiling; she presented Newsfloor (Le Monde Pixelisé) (2020) and several large suspended LED signs stating for example: Patriarchy Kills Love, When women strike the world stops, Feminine beauty is a ready-made or Patriarchy = Climate emergency.

Monographs 

Newsfloor, Jaleh Mansoor (Author), Anita Chari (Author), Walther König,  (01.01.2020)
Viaggio in Sicilia, Free Energy, Vito Planeta (Author), Valentina Bruschi (Author), Leonardo Sciascia (Author), Donatien Grau (Author), Planeta,  (2019)
Foreigners Everywhere by Hal Foster (Author), Bernard Blistène (Author), Nicolas Liucci-Goutnikov (Author), Letizia Ragalia (Introduction), Walther König, Köln; Bilingual edition  (31/03/ 2013)
Economies, Ruba Katrib, Tom McDonough, Museum of Contemporary Art, North Miami, (June 3, 2010)

Books 

 Human Strike and the Art of Creating Freedom, Hal Foster (Forward), Semiotext(e), Dec. 2020 
Lo sciopero umano e l'arte di creare la libertà(Italian), Ilaria Bussoni (Forward) DeriveApprodi, 2017, 
 La Grève humaine: et l'art de créer la liberté, Diaphanes, 2020 
The Human Strike Has Already Begun & Other Essays, Mute, 2013. Print ; eBook 
Notas sobre économia libidinal, MUSAC, 2011, edited by Maria Ines Rodriguez
Some Instructions for the Sharing of Private Property, One Star Press, 2011
Vivre, Vaincre, Editions Dilecta,  2009

Writings  

Towards a Theory of Magic Materialism, Vers une théorie du matérialisme magique, Diaphanes, Issue 8/9 Winter 2019/20
Making Life (im)possible in Jens Hoffmann, In the Meantime. Speculations on Art, Curating, and Exhibitions, Sternberg Press, 2020, 
The Visitor as a Commercial Partner: Notes on the 58th Venice Biennale, E-flux Journal No. 102 – September 2019
L'anno in cui la paura andò in sciopero in È solo l'inizio. Rifiuto, affetti, creatività nel lungo '68, edited by I. Bussoni, N. Martino, Ombre Corte, 2018, 
If our Lives are Black. On Angela Davis and Gina Dent's conference at La Maison de l’Amérique Latine, Paris, May Quarterly Journal, #.17, 14 March 2017
Boredom, edited by Tom McDonough, Documents of Contemporary Art, 2017, 
1977. L’anno dello sciopero umano, Cultura, Il manifesto, 05.04.2017
Our Common Critical Condition, E-flux Journal No. 73 – 05. 2016
Weed and the Practice of Freedom, May Quarterly Journal, #.16, 2016
Towards a Canonic Freedom, Texte zur Kunst, Issue 100, 2015
We Are All Clitoridian Women: Notes on Carla Lonzi's Legacy, E-flux Journal No. 47 – September 2013
Krebber in Bordeaux, Texte zur Kunst Issue 89, 2013
Invisible Curators, Texte zur Kunst, Issue 86, 2012
Draft for aesthetic subjects anaesthetic object, Flashart, January–February 2010
Entrée en matière, May Quarterly Journal, #.4. 06. 2010
 Toward an Imageless Political Education, Diacritics, a review of contemporary criticism, Johns Hopkins University Press, Vol. 39 no.23, Fall 2009
The Emancipated Reader, May Quarterly Journal, #.1 06. 2009
Human strike within the field of libidinal economy, Descent to Revolution, edited by James Voorhies, pp. 144–151, Bureau for Open Culture,  2009
Preface to Coco Fusco, Petit manuel de torture à l'usage des femmes-soldats, Les Prairies Ordinaires, Paris

Interviews  

L’immanenza del linguaggio: un dialogo con Claire Fontaine, Anita Chari, Simone Ciglia, Flashart Italia, June 2020
L’arte di essere libere, Interview with Eva Morletto, Grazia, no. 23 21.05.2020
Claire Fontaine Collective Capital, Interview with Evrim Oralkan, Collecteurs, March 2020
Pretend to be dead, An Interview with Claire Fontaine, Kyra Kordoski, White Fungus, 2015
Giving Shape to Painful Things, Interview Andrew Culp and Ricky Crano, Radical Philosophy, RP175 (Sept/Oct 2012)
Claire Fontaine. La nostra Italia bruciata che non-cambia mai, Laura Larcan, La Repubblica, 3/2/2012
Grève humaine (interrompue), a conversation between Fulvia Carnevale and John Kelsey, May Quarterly Journal, No. 4 March 2010
In Life There is No Purity, Only Struggle, Interview with Bart van der Heide, Metropolis M magazine (February/March 2009)
Acts of Freedom, Interview with Niels Van Tomme, Arts and Papers 33.06 (September 2009)
The Glue and the Wedge: The Cases of Claire Fontaine and Canell and Watkins, Isobel Harbison and Ilaria Gianni No. 124, Circa Art Magazine 2008
Macht Arbeit, Interview with Stephanie Kleefeld Texte zur Kunst, Issue 73, 2009
Claire Fontaine by Anthony Huberman, Bomb Magazine No. 105, 10.2008

Solo exhibitions  

 2005: Claire Fontaine, Galerie Meerrettich im Glaspavillon an der Volksbühne, Berlin
2005: Foreigners Everywhere, Reena Spaulings Fine Art, New York US

2005: Requiem for Jean-Charles de Menezes, Tratari, Graz AT
2005: Étrangers Partout, 21 rue Ste Marthe, Paris FR
2006: Siamo tutti singolarità qualunque, Il piccolo Museion, progetto Garutti, Museion Bolzano IT
2006: Couvrir Les Feux, Zoo Galerie, Nantes, FR
2007: Équivalences, Le Centre d’Art Villa Arson, Nice
2007: The 00's, The history of a decade that has not yet been named, Biennale d’Art Contemporain de Lyon 2007, Institut d’Art Contemporaine, Villeurbanne, Lyon FR
2007: Get Lost, Module, Palais de Tokyo, Paris FR
2007: How to? Kunsthalle Zurich, CH
2007: Taccuini Di Guerra Incivile, T293, Napoli IT
2007: Téléphone Arabe, Air de Paris, Paris FR
2007: Footnotes on the state of exception, Reena Spaulings Fine Art, New York US 01.07
2008: Perplexed in Public, Lisson Gallery, London UK
 2009: Is freedom therapeutic?, Barock: art, science, faith and technology in the contemporary age (curators: Eduardo Cicelyn, Mario Codognato), Museo d’Arte Contemporanea Donna Regina, Napoli
 2011: No Family Life, Air de Paris, Paris
 2012: Généralités, La Douane, Galerie Chantal Crousel, Paris
 2013: Redemptions, C.C.A. Wattis, San Francisco
 2014: Using Walls, Floors, and Ceilings, The Jewish Museum, New York
 2015: Stop Seeking Approval, Metro Pictures, New York
 2016: May our enemies not prosper, Galerie Neu, Berlin
 2018: Same war time zone, Holding Contemporary, Portland, OR
2019: Les printemps seront silencieux, Confort Moderne, Poiters FR
2019: La borsa e la vita, Palazzo Ducale di Genova, Genova, IT
2019: Claire Fontaine, Rolli Days, Strade e palazzo da vivere, Banca Carige, Sede Centrale, Genova, IT
2019: OK NO, Synnika, Frankfurt DE
2019: Ettore Majorana, Viaggio in Siclia, Planeta Sciaranuova, Castiglione di Sicilia IT 2009
2019: Too late to read, Longtang, Zurich CH
2019: Your Money and Your Life, Galeria Av. Da Índia: Tomadas, Lisbon PT

References

Further reading 

 What Comes After Farce by Hal Foster, Human Strike (pg. 59–67) Verso, 224 pages / May 2020 / 
 Out of This Disaster, New Approaches to Art May Emerge, Hal Foster on What—Or May Not—Come After Covid-19, Hal Foster, Literary Hub, May 21, 2020
 On Claire Fontaine at Reena Spaulings, Los Angeles, Anita Chari, May Quarterly Journal, No. 20 14 March 2020
 PFW FW20: Dior's Ode to the Past is a Path to the Future, Eliza Jordan, Whitewall 26.02. 2020
Sorry, das ist Poster-Feminismus, Von Johanna Dürrholz, Frankfurter Allgemeine, 20.03.2020
 A Companion to Feminist Art, Hilary Robinson (Editor), Maria Elena Buszek (Editor), Dana Arnold (Series Editor) The Hidden Abode Beneath/Behind/Beyond the Factory Floor, Gendered Labor, and the Human Strike: Claire Fontaine's Italian Marxist Feminism, (p. 369) Jaleh Mansoor, Wiley-Blackwell, 2019  2019
Collettivi di artisti, sul mercato l’unione fa la forza, Silvia Anna Barrilà, Il Sole 24 Ore, 04.08.2019
Claire Fontaine: la borsa e la vita in Il primo amore, Umberto Sebastiano, 23.03.19
Speculation as a Mode of Production, Forms of Value Subjectivity in Art and Capital, Marina Vishmidt, Haymarket Books,  2019
Going Nowhere, Slow: The Aesthetics and Politics of Depression, Mikkel Krause Frantzen, Zero Books  2019
Nuova luce su Ettore Majorana. Claire Fontaine protagonista di Viaggio in Sicilia di Planeta, Desirée Maida, Artibune 08.2019
Storie dell’Arte / Claire Fontaine, ready-made per riflettere sul senso delle cose, Maria Chiara Valacchi, Corriere della Sera 30.10.2019
 Marshall Plan Modernism Italian Postwar Abstraction and the Beginnings of Autonomia, Jaleh Mansoor, Duke University Press 
Prendi i soldi e vivi!, Andrea Rossetti, Exibart, Aprile 2019
Les pompiers entre dévouement et amertume, Romain Pudal, Le Monde diplomatique, mars 2017
Le traiettorie devianti delle immagini, Giovanna Ferrara, Il manifesto, 20.10.2017
Claire Fontaine by François Piron, Flashart, 20.12. 2016
Are we all Migrants?, Patrice Joly, Zero Deux, Issue #.76 2015
Portrait of Claire Fontaine by Raimar Stange, Spike Magazine, No. 36 Summer 2013
 Crisis and Redemption: Claire Fontaine and the perceptual crisis of Neoliberalism, Anita Chari, Contemporary Political Theory 2013
Claire Fontaine, Chris Wiley, Reviews, Frieze, Issue 146 04.2012
 Locating Claire Fontaine, Marie Heilich, Temporary Art Review, January 18, 2012
Their Insurrection, ready-made artist Claire Fontaine fuses art, politics and irony, Rozalia Jovanovic, Modern Painters 10. 2011
Critic's Picks, Mexico City: Claire Fontaine, Montserrat Albores Gleason, Artforum 03.2011
Art Since 1900: Modernism, Antimodernism, Postmodernism by Hal Foster (Author), Rosalind Krauss (Author), Yve-Alain Bois (Author), Benjamin H. D. Buchloh (Author), David Joselit (Author), Thames & Hudson,  2011
Just who on earth is Claire Fontaine?, Ossian Ward, London Time Out, Thu Feb 3 2011
Conversations, Manuel Fadat avec Claire Fontaine – Stephen Wright – Paul Ardenne – Alain Badiou, Art et politique, éditions Appendices, 2010
Younger Than Jesus: The Reader, Steidl & Partners 2009
Get Lost, Rachel Lois Clapham, July 2008
Art of the possible: an interview with Jacques Ranciere, Fulvia Carnevale and John Kelsey, Artforum, p. 256, issue XLV, N.7, (March 2007)
 Pseudonyms, strikes and keys; appropriation and symbols, Vivian Sky Rehberg, Frieze, Issue #.105 04.03. 2007
 Musings on the Mutinies to Come, Jerry Saltz, The Village Voice 11 October 2005

External links 
 Tiqqun: Conscious Organ of The Imaginary Party
 Tiqqun: Theory of Bloom
 Ready-Made Artist and Human Strike: A few Clarifications Claire Fontaine
 Instagram
 Twitter

Italian conceptual artists
Italian contemporary artists
Art duos
Italian artist groups and collectives